The men's 100 meter running deer, single shots was a shooting sports event held as part of the shooting at the 1912 Summer Olympics programme. It was the second appearance of the event, which had been introduced in 1908. The competition was held from Friday, 28 June 1912 to Monday, 1 July 1912.

Thirty-four sport shooters from seven nations competed.

Results

References

External links
 
 

Shooting at the 1912 Summer Olympics
100 meter running deer at the Olympics